Kieran Martin (born 1990 in Drumraney, County Westmeath) is an Irish sportsperson. A dual player, he plays both Gaelic football and hurling with his local club Maryland and has been a member of the Westmeath senior inter-county team in both codes since 2009.

Playing career
Martin was a playing member of the team that defeated Dublin at Parnell Park in the 2019 O'Byrne Cup final, his county's first time to win that trophy since 1988. He won his second piece of silverware of 2019 when Westmeath won the 2019 National Football League Division 3 league title by a goal against Laois at Croke Park, Martin scored 0–1. He spent two years as Westmeath captain until Kevin Maguire succeeded him from May 2021.

His 2021 season came to an end after he sustained a rupture to his left achilles tendon during a National Football League fixture against Down.

He scored a decisive goal in the 2022 Tailteann Cup Final. It came days after the death of close friend Eoin Farrell.

He is among his county's highest championship scorers.

Honours
Westmeath
 Tailteann Cup (1): 2022
 National Football League Division 3 (1): 2019
 O'Byrne Cup (1): 2019

References

1990 births
Living people
Dual players
Maryland hurlers
Maryland Gaelic footballers
Westmeath inter-county hurlers
Westmeath inter-county Gaelic footballers